Havin' myself a Time is an album by vocalist Kim Parker with the Kenny Drew Trio recorded in 1981 and released on the Soul Note label.

Reception

The Allmusic review says Parker's "voice is so appealing that it is surprising that she has done so little since... This is her definitive record".

Track listing
 "Havin' Myself a Time" (Ralph Rainger,  Leo Robin) - 5:25   
 "Paris Is a Lonely Town" (Harold Arlen, E. Y. Harburg) - 7:17   
 "A Sleepin' Bee" (Arlen, Truman Capote) - 6:44   
 "Ev'rything I Love" (Cole Porter) - 4:38   
 "The Underdog" (Al Cohn, Dave Frishberg) - 5:35   
 "Rain Go Away" (Phil Woods) - 5:05   
 "Azure" (Duke Ellington, Irving Mills) - 5:40

Personnel
Kim Parker - vocals
Kenny Drew - piano
Mads Vinding - bass
Ed Thigpen - drums

References

Kenny Drew albums
1982 albums
Black Saint/Soul Note albums